The Adelaide Football Club, nicknamed the Crows, are a professional Australian rules football club based in Adelaide, South Australia that was founded in 1990. The Crows have fielded a men's team in the Australian Football League (AFL) since 1991, and a women's team in the AFL Women's (AFLW) competition since 2017. The club's offices and training facilities are located in the western Adelaide suburb of West Lakes, at the site of the club's former home ground Football Park. Since 2014 Adelaide have played home matches at the Adelaide Oval, a 53,500-seat stadium located a few hundred metres north of the Adelaide CBD.

The Crows were formed in 1990 as the de facto state team representing South Australia in the AFL. They were originally owned by the South Australian National Football League (SANFL), though they gained administrative independence in 2014. They played their first season in 1991 and finished in 9th place, the highest ranking of any expansion club in the AFL in a debut year. The men's team won both the 1997 and 1998 Grand Finals, and have appeared in 15 finals series in their 29-year history. Adelaide is the most successful team in the AFL Women's competition, being the only club to have won multiple premierships; in 2017, 2019 and 2022. It also fields a reserves team in the South Australian National Football League (SANFL), along with the other South Australian football team in the Port Adelaide Football Club.

The men's team is currently coached by Matthew Nicks and captained by Jordan Dawson.

History

1990s: Foundation and back-to-back triumph
After the VFL was renamed the AFL for the 1990 season, the SANFL clubs unanimously resolved, in 1990, that a team would not be entered into the AFL until 1992. The AFL refused to accept this, and revised negotiations with individual clubs Port Adelaide and Norwood. Two months later, the Port Adelaide Football Club reached terms of agreement with the AFL to enter a team into its competition in season 1991. The other nine SANFL clubs reacted strongly and entered into litigation in an endeavour to halt Port's bid. As the terms offered were more favourable than previously offered, talks were resumed. On 19 September 1990, the AFL approved the bid for a new South Australian club to enter into the league rather than a single existing SANFL club.

The Adelaide Crows played their first season in the AFL in 1991. Inaugural coach Graham Cornes and captain Chris McDermott led Adelaide to a respectable ninth place out of 15 in the league, with 10 wins and 12 losses and a percentage of 89.44. Adelaide's first AFL game was against  on Friday 22 March at their then home ground, Football Park. The Crows defeated the eventual premiers by a hefty 86-point margin, winning 24.11 (155) to 9.15 (69). The club reached its first finals series in the 1993 AFL season, eventually losing to Essendon in the preliminary final.

Premiership glory in 1997 and 1998
The year 1997 marked the entry of a second South Australian club, . The Crows finished fourth to qualify for its first finals series since 1993, and hosted fifth-placed  in the First Elimination Final. In the first final ever to be played at Football Park, the Crows won 14.15 (99) to 9.12 (66). The Crows won narrowly in a controversial match, where a clear forward 50 mark to Geelong's Leigh Colbert during a critical stage of the third quarter was not awarded by field umpire Grant Vernon. Final scores: Adelaide 11.10 (76) to Geelong 9.14 (68). Despite losing Coleman Medallist Tony Modra, who had kicked 84 goals for the season, to an ACL injury in the first quarter and trailing by 31 points at half time, the Crows kicked four unanswered goals in the last quarter to record a two-point victory, 12.21 (93) to 13.13 (91), with Darren Jarman kicking a goal to put Adelaide in front with less than two minutes remaining. This allowed the Crows to qualify for their first AFL Grand Final, to be played against  at the MCG a week later.

St Kilda, chasing just their second premiership in VFL/AFL history, were warm favourites to win the Grand Final, having come first in the minor round and won both of their finals by margins of 46 and 31 points, against an Adelaide side without Tony Modra, Mark Ricciuto and goalsneak Peter Vardy due to injury. However, the Crows again overcame a half-time deficit, kicking 14 second-half goals to win by 31 points, 19.11 (125) to 13.16 (94). Darren Jarman kicked six goals, five of which came in the last quarter, whilst utility Shane Ellen kicked a career-best five and Troy Bond kicked four. Andrew McLeod, who gathered 31 possessions across half-back and in the midfield, won the Norm Smith Medal for the best player on-field in the Grand Final. The win is arguably one of the finest moments in South Australian sporting history.

Few expected the Crows to successfully defend their premiership the following year. Adelaide often struggled in close matches during the 1998 AFL season; seven of their nine losses were by 13 points or less, compared to only three wins by corresponding margins (they finished the regular season fifth on the ladder, with a record of 13–9). The Crows were well beaten by Melbourne in the qualifying final at the MCG by 48 points, and at the time, looked far from a premiership threat. Since season 2000, a loss in the finals by a team outside the top four would result in instant elimination, but the Crows benefited from a quirk in the McIntyre finals system that was in use during the 90's and still progressed to the second week, drawn to play a semi final against the Sydney Swans at the SCG. The Crows bounced back from their disappointing first finals loss and recorded a comprehensive upset 27-point win against the Swans in the wet, which set up a Preliminary Final rematch against the Western Bulldogs. Despite going into the match as underdogs, the Crows played some of their best football of the year to soundly beat the Dogs by 68 points - 24.17 (161) to 13.15 (93). It was a complete contrast to the thriller that took place the previous year, with Matthew Robran kicking six goals and Andrew McLeod, opposed to renowned tagger Tony Liberatore, booting seven.

Like the previous year, Adelaide went into the Grand Final as underdogs, playing against , who had won the premiership in 1996 and had won eleven consecutive matches leading up to the Grand Final. North Melbourne led by 24 points at half-time, 6.15 (51) to 4.3 (27), with only their inaccurate goalkicking keeping Adelaide in the contest. However, as they had in the previous year, Adelaide dominated the second half to win by 35 points, 15.15 (105) to 8.22 (70) - the result making Adelaide the only club during the decade of the 1990s to achieve the feat of winning back to back AFL premierships. Darren Jarman kicked five goals, while Andrew McLeod won his second successive Norm Smith Medal, an unprecedented feat. Club legend Mark Ricciuto won the Crows' Club Champion award in 1998. Following a disappointing year in 1999, premiership coach Malcolm Blight resigned from the role and the Crows entered the new millennium with two premierships under their belt.

2000s: Finals and near misses
The Crows next made the finals in 2001 AFL season, this after losing their opening three matches for the season. Adelaide played fifth-placed  at the MCG in the First Elimination Final and were roundly defeated, 17.16 (118) to 6.14 (50). High-profile forward Darren Jarman announced his retirement after the match. Adelaide's impressive 2002 AFL season (in which they achieved a 15–7 win–loss record) came undone at the penultimate stage, losing to Collingwood in the Preliminary Final at the MCG. Ben Hart won his second Malcolm Blight Medal in 2002, with Tyson Edwards finishing runner-up. Brett Burton led the Crows' goalkickers with 51. Hart and Mark Ricciuto were both named as All-Australians. Adelaide then extracted some revenge by defeating Collingwood in the pre-season competition in 2003, a first win of its kind for the club. That season, Adelaide captain Mark Ricciuto became the first and (as of 2022) only Crow to win the Brownlow Medal for the best and fairest player in the AFL in a three-way tie with Adam Goodes and Nathan Buckley. The Crows returned to finals in 2005 and recorded a famous win in what to this day remains the only Showdown match against rivals  in the semi-finals. They then lost once more at the penultimate stage (preliminary final), to West Coast at Subiaco Oval by 16 points. This was a feat the club unfortunately repeated in 2006 when they again lost to West Coast in the preliminary final, this time at home and by an even smaller margin.

Remarkably, Adelaide went on to qualify for finals for each of the remaining seasons in the 2000s, falling short at the elimination or semi-final on each occasion. Collingwood proved to be the most obvious of villains, knocking the Crows out of the finals race successively in 2008 and 2009. Andrew McLeod and Bernie Vince won club best and fairest awards in that time.

Adelaide's finals runs in the 2000s

2010s: Rebuilding and tragedy
Adelaide had a disastrous start to the 2010 season, losing their first six matches of the home and away season. They did recover to some extent in the back half of the year, finishing 11th with nine wins and thirteen losses, the first time under coach Neil Craig that the team did not make the finals. The season marked a turning point, with the likes of McLeod, Simon Goodwin and fellow stars Brett Burton, Tyson Edwards and Trent Hentschel all announcing their retirements during the season. Long-term defender and club stalwart Nathan Bock announced he was leaving the club to join new side . These changes led to a disastrous 2011 campaign, which proved to be the second worst season in the club's history. After a 103-point loss to fading champions , the club's longest-serving coach Neil Craig stepped down, handing the reins to assistant coach and former premiership captain Mark Bickley as caretaker for the remainder of the season.

Scott Thompson won the Malcolm Blight Medal (best and fairest award) for the season. New coach Brenton Sanderson began his era at the club with a pre-season premiership in 2012 and followed up that success with an above-expectations regular season; the Crows finishing 17-5 and never once losing consecutive matches. Adelaide eventually qualified to face minor premiers  at the MCG in the First Preliminary Final. Hawthorn led for most of the match and despite Adelaide taking the lead with five minutes remaining, the Hawks responded to win the match by five points, yet another heartbreaking finals series loss for the Crows. Adelaide would then fall under the weight of expectations to some degree in the 2013 and 2014 seasons, narrowly missing the top 8 on both occasions. This led to Sanderson being sacked at the end of the 2014 season. The club moved home matches to the newly redeveloped Adelaide Oval at the start of the 2014 season, though to this day the Crows retain their training and administrative headquarters at their old home stadium, Football Park.

2012: Scandal and Investigation
At the end of 2012, it was revealed that Adelaide had been found guilty of breaching the salary cap and tampering with the draft. As a sign of cooperation with the AFL, Adelaide forfeited themselves from the first two rounds of the 2012 draft. At a hearing at AFL House in Melbourne, both the Adelaide Crows and current CEO at the time, Steven Trigg, were both fined $300,000 and $50,000 respectively. The Adelaide Football Club were also suspended from participating in the first two rounds of the 2013 draft. It's widely accepted to be the league's biggest salary cap and list management scandal since Carlton in 2002.

2014: Transfer of SANFL licence
In March 2014, on the eve of the new season, the South Australian Football Commission announced it had struck a deal with the Adelaide Football Club which required the SANFL to transfer its ownership of the Crows'  licence to the club, in exchange for payments totalling $11.326 million between 2013 and 2028. The arrangement marked the first time the Adelaide Football Club had independent control of its own administration and came in conjunction with measures designed to solidify the SANFL's control of game development and the sport in South Australia.

2015: Death of Phil Walsh
The 2015 season started successfully for the Adelaide Football Club with a 77-point win over reigning preliminary finalists . Newly appointed coach Phil Walsh oversaw a rapidly improving team that became known for their skilled ball use and ability to grind out wins. During the season, Adelaide was cleared of any wrongdoing by the AFL in the Eddie Betts affair, which became newsworthy following an allegation that Betts's transfer to the Crows from  had been illegally signed and approved as much as 18 months prior to his move.

On 3 July, two days prior to Adelaide's then-scheduled round 14 match against , coach Phil Walsh was stabbed to death by his son at the age of 55 in his Somerton Park home. His son Cy Walsh would later be found not guilty of murder due to mental incompetence and placed under a lifetime psychiatric supervision licence, ordering that he be detained indefinitely in a secure psychiatric facility. The tragedy was followed by an outpouring of sympathy and tributes from the club's fans and the wider AFL community. The match against the Cats was cancelled, with both teams receiving two premiership points each. Adelaide's SANFL team's match against , scheduled for the next day, was postponed until later in the season.

On 6 July, assistant coach Scott Camporeale was appointed interim coach for the remainder of the season, while  premiership coach John Worsfold was hired as coaching director to support Camporeale. Inspiringly, the team rebounded to win six of their next seven games and qualify for the 2015 finals series, where they defeated the Western Bulldogs by seven points in a thrilling elimination final at the MCG. Their season ended when they lost to eventual premiers  the next week.

2016–2019: Don Pyke era
Star midfielder for many years Patrick Dangerfield left the club at the end of the 2015 season (a season in which he won the club's best and fairest) and Don Pyke, a former premiership player and assistant coach with  who had also been an assistant coach at Adelaide from 2005 to 2006, was appointed Adelaide's senior coach for at least three years. Adelaide was widely tipped to slide out of the finals in 2016 but the Crows proved to be one of the successes of the season, comfortably qualifying for a home elimination final and defeating  by 62 points, before being eliminated the next week by eventual beaten grand finalists,  in the semi-finals. The club had a dominant 2017 season, winning their opening six games and never falling below second place for the entire season. Adelaide claimed their second McClelland Trophy as minor premiers. Despite starting as rampaging hot favourites, the Crows lost the match by 48 points and finished runners up for the first time in their history.

The club struggled to replicate its 2017 form in the 2018 AFL season. Prior to the season, Adelaide players went on a controversial pre-season camp that led to a decline in morale among the club's players. Adelaide struggled with injuries during the year, including Captain Taylor Walker, Rory Sloane, Brad Crouch, Tom Lynch, Rory Laird, and Richard Douglas. Combined with the loss of Cameron and Lever, the Crows struggled throughout the year but held on to win twelve games, including against 2017 Premiers  and soon-to-be 2018 Premiers West Coast. The club finished 12th on the ladder with 12 wins, 10 losses, and a percentage of 104.1, and below crosstown rivals Port Adelaide who finished 10th, but with 3.5 more percentage points. This put Adelaide out of the finals for the first time since 2014. One highlight towards the end of the year was Rory Sloane who, despite rumours of a trade home to Victoria, signed a five-year contract to effectively play out his time as a one-club player.

There were lofty aspirations going into 2019, with many expecting them to play finals or even in the premiership. Despite fewer injuries, the club failed to meet these lofty expectations of finals, finishing 11th with 10 wins, 12 losses, and 100.9 percentage points. There was much media coverage given to the team throughout the season, with concerns raised about player retention and the coaching staff, especially with players like Bryce Gibbs, Josh Jenkins, and Eddie Betts dropped on and off throughout the season due to issues of form. Following the end of their season, the club began an external review of their football operations, with many musing about the future of players and coaching staff. Prior to the conclusion of the review, co-captain Taylor Walker resigned his captaincy after four years to focus on his football and family. A week later, Coach Don Pyke stepped down, a decision unrelated to the reviews that were occurring.

2018 Adelaide Crows pre-season camp

The 2018 Adelaide Crows pre-season camp was a summer camp undertaken by players of the Adelaide Football Club from January 29 to February 2 in the lead-up to the 2018 AFL season.
In Eddie Betts' biography, he released details of what happened at the camp. These revelations caused many to question what had been said to that point regarding the camp.
Following the release of Eddie Betts biography, Josh Jenkins released a statement with further details from the camp. His opposition to aspects of the camp led to him being ostracised and was the reason he left the club.

2020–present: Matthew Nicks era
Former Port Adelaide and Greater Western Sydney assistant coach Matthew Nicks was appointed as Adelaide's senior coach on October 15, 2019, replacing the outgoing Pyke. Under new coach Nicks, the Crows lost the first 13 matches of the coronavirus-affected 2020 AFL season and ultimately claimed their first wooden spoon in club history. However, the Crows' disastrous season did end with some optimism, as the Crows broke the drought in round 15 against Hawthorn and won three matches in a row towards the season's conclusion. Young wingman Lachlan Sholl received a Rising Star nomination in their Round 18 win over Carlton. Furthermore, the Crows received their highest-ever draft pick at the 2020 AFL draft, and with pick 2 they selected Riley Thilthorpe from the West Adelaide Football Club. Ruckman Reilly O'Brien won the Malcolm Blight Medal as the Crow's best and fairest player of the season.

The Crows won their first game of the 2021 AFL season, beating the reigning Grand Finalists Geelong in an upset victory. The Crows improved slightly over their disastrous 2020 campaign, losing only one of their first four games. They had a few more wins, including another upset over the eventual premiers Melbourne. They finished 15th on the AFL ladder, and ball-magnet Rory Laird won their best-and-fairest medal. Taylor Walker enjoyed a return to form in 2021, and a hot start to the season saw him finish tied at fifth in the Coleman Medal. The Crows had three Rising Star nominations throughout the year, going to Thilthorpe in Round 13 for his last-minute heroics against St. Kilda, midfielder Harry Schoenberg in Round 19, and two-time nominee Sholl in Round 4.

Walker was banned from the AFL for six games between the 2021 and 2022 AFL seasons due to racist comments directed towards Robbie Young of the North Adelaide Football Club mid-way through a SANFL match. Despite a public apology to both Young and Walker's Indigenous teammates, Walker was booed during Adelaide's away games after the end of his suspension. After requesting a move home to South Australia and subsequently nominating the Crows, high-value Sydney wingman Jordan Dawson was traded to Adelaide in the 2021 trade period. The Crows hosted the first-ever Friday night Showdown in Round 3, and claimed one of their best-ever wins via an after-the-siren bending kick from the recruit Dawson, who received best-on-ground honours. Captain Rory Sloane ruptured his ACL in the round 5 victory over Richmond and sat on the sidelines for the rest of 2022, leaving captaincy duties to the rest of leadership team. The role of captain rotated between Reilly O'Brien, Ben Keays, Brodie Smith, and Tom Doedee for the remainder of the season. Promising young small forward Josh Rachele received a Rising Star nomination in Round 4. The Crows notched up a few more wins to boast their best season since 2019. Adelaide traded in Izak Rankine at a high price, leaving them no first-round draft picks in the 2022 AFL draft. Rory Laird was awarded his third Malcolm Blight medal, tied as the most by any Adelaide player ever alongside Simon Goodwin, Andrew McLeod and Mark Ricciuto.

Club symbols

Club guernsey

Adelaide currently has three guernsey designs which are used in different matches throughout the season. The club's guernseys are currently supplied by Irish sportswear company O'Neills.

Present
Home guernsey
The home guernsey features navy blue, red and gold hoops. It is worn at all matches designated as home games for the club as well as in selected away games (currently only Geelong, Port Adelaide, Western Bulldogs, and Sydney). The jumper is worn with navy shorts at all home and away games, except for away Showdowns, where it is paired with white shorts. It has had only minor variations through its history since debuting with the club in 1991, including adding a white outline to the numbers from 1996 to 2020 which has now been removed since the start of the 2021 season, and the removal of yellow cuffs and addition of navy blue panels down the sides (due to manufacturers template design) in 2006. In 2009 the yellow cuffs and full hoops returned. In 2010 the hoops were cut off again at the sides. For 2016, the club removed the side panels, returning to the full hoops of the original design. The original base design/idea has never changed in the club's 30-year history.

Clash guernseys
The clash guernsey is a colour-swap of the home guernsey, featuring a gold base rather than navy. It is paired with white shorts, and worn in away games where the darker home guernsey may cause a clash of colours with the home team. The current clash guernsey was introduced in 2021, and has replaced a series of white jumpers used since 2010, meaning the clash jumper features club colours for the first time since 2009. A red clash guernsey was introduced in 2021 featuring a red base, which was used against Hawthorn and Richmond.

The red variant has become the primary clash guernsey for the Crows in 2022.

Indigenous guernseys
The club's Indigenous guernsey has been a rotating design since it was first introduced in during the 2013 season vs. North Melbourne. The first iteration of the Adelaide Indigenous guernsey was a simple swap from Navy to Black, representing the colours in the Australian Aboriginal Flag. Since 2014 however, they guernsey has featured art on a navy base from a wide number of indigenous artists and past players, such as Andrew McLeod and Ben Davis.

Past
In previous seasons, the Crows have had variations of alternate guernseys.

Pre-season guernsey (1996–98)
The club briefly used an alternate design in the pre-season competition. It was still in the club colours, but featured the club logo prominently on the front and continuing over onto the back.

Away guernsey (1999–2009)
The away guernsey was originally intended for use in all matches designated as away games, except finals. The design had changed several times over the years since it was first used in 1999. From 2006 the red was removed from the top of the guernsey, moving it closer to the home guernsey. Its usage had waned since the introduction of the "clash" guernsey, to the point where it was only used twice in 2007, against the Western Bulldogs in round 2 and Collingwood in round 22. In a few away matches that year, the club also continued to use the traditional "home" guernsey, something which had rarely been done since the away strip was introduced. In response to this, a new away guernsey was introduced in 2008 featuring more red and yellow with a flying crow on the front – similar in design to the mid-90s pre-season jumper.

Clash guernsey (2006–2020)

The clash guernsey was first introduced for season 2006 and was radically different from the "home" and "away" designs at the time. It was worn at all away games where the AFL deemed there to be a clash with the home team's guernsey design. Initially, the only clubs officially on the "clash list" were Carlton, Essendon, Fremantle, Melbourne and Richmond. Despite this, the AFL forced the club to wear it against other teams, such as Hawthorn and St Kilda in 2007, West Coast in 2008 and the Brisbane Lions in 2008 and 2009. Eventually, the clash jumper was required to be worn in nearly all away games.

The first clash guernsey was red, and was worn from 2006 to 2009. The club first adopted a white clash guernsey in 2010. It featured the club logo on the front with stylised curves in club colours on the front and back with navy stripes down the sides. The design continued to be changed a number of times over the years, but remained predominately white until the end of the 2020 season.

 Alternative guernsey (2016-2017)

The alternative guernsey was the same design as the white clash guernsey of the time, but with a gold base. It was worn in away games in which it provided a greater contrast with the home team than either the home or white clash guernseys. Those teams were North Melbourne, Carlton, Fremantle and Western Bulldogs football clubs. It was always worn with white shorts.

Heritage guernsey (2004-2007)

During the mid-2000's the crows adopted three different guernsey designs to wear during the AFL's Heritage Round. The 2004 iteration featured the tri-colour home guernsey, but with the AFC crest on the chest and removal of white stroke to the numbers. All heritage guernseys featured the Player's name & debut number above the manufacturer's jock tag. Controversially during the 2005 heritage round, the crows wore an adaptation of a 1930s South Australian state guernsey, with the AFC monogram replacing the SA monogram, which prompted outrage from Port Adelaide coach Mark Williams. The club returned to a similar home design for the 2006 & 2007 heritage rounds with the left panel of the guernsey featuring the colours of all SANFL clubs, before the Heritage Round was scrapped by the AFL.

Rivalries

Port Adelaide

Adelaide has a fierce rivalry with fellow South Australian AFL team Port Adelaide. Matches between the two teams are known as the Showdown. The Showdown rivalry significantly draws upon the bitter, winner take all, competition for the two South Australian licences to join the AFL in the 1980s and early 1990s. The Showdown is often considered the best, and most bitter, in the Australian Football League with Malcolm Blight, Australian Football Hall of Fame Legend, stating in 2009 that "there is no doubt it is the greatest rivalry in football".

Membership base and sponsorship
In 2006, the club made history becoming the first club in VFL/AFL history to have more than 50,000 members. They broke that record in 2007, signing up 50,146 members after only round one of the season. The club failed to continue this record run and subsequently signed 48,720 members in 2008. The club has enjoyed a long-standing partnership with Toyota since its inception, leading the club to be known in promotional materials as the "Camry Crows".

Two-time Grand Slam tennis champion Lleyton Hewitt has been the club's number one ticket holder since December 2002. Former federal politician Kate Ellis is the number 1 female ticket holder and Greg Champion, a musician and radio broadcaster, is the Melbourne number 1 ticket holder. Australian golfer Adam Scott is also an honorary member of the club.

Sponsorship

Season figures

*Average home crowd for 2020 taken from the 9 home games played with limited crowds due to the COVID-19 pandemic.

^Average home crowd for 2020 taken from the 2 home games played with limited crowds due to the COVID-19 pandemic.

Honours and records

Club achievements

Records
 Highest score for: 30.8 (188) – vs  at Football Park on 2 June 2006 (Round 10)
 Lowest score for: 2.9 (21) – vs  at Docklands Stadium on 9 July 2021 (Round 17)
 Highest score against: 32.18 (210) – vs  at Kardinia Park on 9 May 1992 (Round 8)
 Lowest score against: 1.7 (13) – vs  at Football Park on 11 July 2009 (Round 15)
 Highest aggregate score: 44.33 (297) – vs  at Kardinia Park on 9 May 1992 (Round 8)
 Lowest aggregate score: 11.19 (85) – vs  at the MCG on 26 April 2009 (Round 5)
 Lowest winning score: 6.12 (48) – vs  at Football Park on 25 August 1997 (Round 21)
 Highest losing score: 19.11 (125) – vs  at Football Park on 6 May 2000 (Round 9)
 Highest quarter score: 14.2 (86) – vs  at Football Park on 28 July 1996 (Round 17, second quarter)
 Greatest winning margin: 139 points – vs  at Football Park on 16 July 1993 (Round 16)
 Greatest losing margin: 141 points – vs  at the Gabba on 24 July 2004 (Round 17)
 Longest winning streak: 10 matches – from 18 June 2005 (Round 13, vs  at Telstra Dome) to 27 August 2005 (Round 22, vs  at Subiaco Oval)
 Longest losing streak: 16 matches – from 11 August 2019 (Round 21, vs  at Optus Stadium) to 23 August 2020 (Round 13, vs  at Adelaide Oval)
 Longest winning streak against an opponent: 13 matches – vs  from 14 May 2011 (Round 8, at Football Park) to 13 July 2020 (Round 3, at Metricon Stadium)
 Longest losing streak against an opponent: 7 matches – vs  from 6 August 2000 (Round 22, at Football Park) to 31 August 2003 (Round 22, at Football Park), vs  from 15 April 2012 (Round 3, at the MCG) to 22 April 2016 (Round 5, at the MCG)
 Largest home attendance: 53,817 – vs  at the Adelaide Oval on 22 September 2017 (Preliminary Final)
 Largest non-finals attendance: 54,790 – vs  at the MCG on 12 July 2013 (Round 16)
 Largest attendance: 100,021 – vs Richmond at the MCG on 30 September 2017 (Grand Final)
 Most goals in a match by an individual: 13 – Tony Modra vs  at Football Park on 16 July 1993 (Round 16), Tony Modra vs  at Football Park on 27 March 1994 (Round 1)
 Most disposals in a match by an individual: 51 – Scott Thompson vs  at Metricon Stadium on 20 August 2011 (Round 22)

AFL finishing positions (1991–present)

Premierships

Premiership teams

"Team of the Decade"
While some sides named their "Team of the Century" to coincide with the AFL centenary celebrations in 1996, Adelaide only joined the league in 1991, and so later on named their "Team of the Decade", covering the period from 1991 to 2000. As well as earning selection in the team, Mark Ricciuto was named 'Player of the Decade' and Mark Bickley 'Team Man of the Decade.'

Coaches
 Graham Cornes, 1991–1994
 Robert Shaw, 1995–1996
 Malcolm Blight, 1997–1999
 Gary Ayres, 2000–2004*
 Neil Craig, 2004–2011**
 Mark Bickley, 2011 (interim)
 Brenton Sanderson, 2012–2014
 Phil Walsh, 2015***
 Scott Camporeale, 2015 (interim)
 Don Pyke, 2016–2019
 Matthew Nicks, 2020–present

*Gary Ayres was told that his contract would not be extended when it expired after the 2004 season, and he decided to quit immediately. Assistant coach Neil Craig took over from round 14 as a caretaker coach and was later appointed senior coach for 2005 and beyond.

Post-season, the club underwent a search for a new coach and hired Brenton Sanderson for the role from 2012.

***Phil Walsh died midway through his first year as coach, the victim of stab wounds in a domestic incident. Assistant coach Scott Camporeale was appointed interim coach for the remainder of the season. After the season, Don Pyke was appointed senior coach from 2016.

Captains
 Chris McDermott, 1991–1994
 Tony McGuinness, 1995–1996
 Mark Bickley, 1997–2000
 Mark Ricciuto, 2001–2007
 Simon Goodwin, 2008–2010
 Nathan van Berlo, 2011–2014*
 Taylor Walker, 2015–2019**
 Rory Sloane, 2019–2022**
 Jordan Dawson, 2023–present

*Nathan van Berlo missed the entire 2014 season after injuring his right Achilles tendon in pre-season training. Rory Sloane and Patrick Dangerfield acted as co-captains during his absence.

**Taylor Walker and Rory Sloane were co-captains for the 2019 season. After the season, Walker stepped down, leaving Sloane as the sole captain of the club.

Current playing list and coaching staff

Covid top-up list

For the 2022 season, in the event that an AFL club has less than 28 players available due to coronavirus restrictions, each club can select from a list of 20 state league players who can be called up to AFL level.

Past players
See List of Adelaide Football Club players

Pre-season competition

AFL Women's team

The Adelaide AFLW team is the club's women's team in the AFL Women's league. A founding member of the AFLW, the football club launched a bid to enter a team in the 2017 AFL Women's season in April 2016. The bid was constructed in partnership with AFL Northern Territory, with the club to share resources and facilities between its Adelaide base and AFLNT's Darwin location. The bid became a success in June of that year when the league announced they had been awarded one of eight inaugural licences.

Under inaugural coach Bec Goddard, the team won the first ever AFLW premiership in 2017. The season was also a highlight for individual success with co-captain Erin Phillips winning the league most valuable player and best on ground in the grand final. Missing the finals in 2018, Goddard quit as coach and was replaced by Matthew Clarke for the 2019 season. Winning six out of the seven home and away games, the club returned to finals and won its second premiership with a 45-point win against . Erin Phillips repeated her individual success by winning the league MVP for the second time and the grand final best on ground despite leaving the ground injured in the third quarter. It was announced in August 2019, the partnership between Adelaide and AFLNT would not continue. During the COVID-19-interrupted 2020 season, the Crows slumped to only two wins and failed to reach the finals. The club quickly rose back up the following year and won 7 of 9 home-and-away matches, and claimed the minor premiership for the 2021 season.

Current squad

Season summaries

^ Denotes the ladder was split into two conferences. Figure refers to the club's overall finishing position in the home-and-away season.

SANFL team

The Adelaide Crows were granted a license to field a stand-alone reserves men's team in the South Australian National Football League (SANFL) in 2014. Prior to this date AFL-listed players at the club were drafted to SANFL clubs, and would play for them when not selected for the AFL team.

Club song 
The club song is sung to the tune of the US Marines Hymn.

We're the pride of South Australia

And we're known as the Adelaide Crows.

We're courageous, stronger, and faster

And respected by our foes

Admiration of the nation

Our determination shows.

We're the pride of South Australia

We're the mighty Adelaide Crows!

We give our best from coast to coast,

Where the story will be told,

As we fight the rugged battles.

The flag will be our goal.

Our skill and nerve will see us through.

Our commitment ever grows.

We're the pride of South Australia.

We're the mighty Adelaide Crows!

See also

 Adelaide Football Club coaches
 Australian rules football in South Australia
 History of the Adelaide Football Club
 Sport in Australia
 Sport in South Australia
 :Category:Adelaide Football Club players

Notes

References

External links

 

 
Australian rules football clubs established in 1990
Sporting clubs in Adelaide
Australian Football League clubs
Australian rules football clubs in South Australia
1990 establishments in Australia